The 1948 Washington and Lee Generals football team was an American football team that represented Washington and Lee University during the 1948 college football season as a member of the Southern Conference. In their third year under head coach Art Lewis, the team compiled an overall record of 4–6, with a mark of 2–2 in conference play.

Schedule

References

Washington and Lee
Washington and Lee Generals football seasons
Washington and Lee Generals football